Symphony No. 9 is a 2019 Iranian film written by Mohammad-Reza Honarmand and Hamed Afzali, produced by Zeinab Taghvaei and directed by Mohammad-Reza Honarmand. Starring Hamid Farrokhnezhad, Sareh Bayat and Mohammad Reza Foroutan. The film premiered at the 37th Fajr Film Festival.

Cast
 Hamid Farrokhnezhad as a Malak al-Maut
 Sareh Bayat as Rahil
 Mohammad-Reza Foroutan as Kambiz Amini / Bardia Amini
 Alireza Kamali as Cyrus the Great
 Mehrdad Sedighian as Bardiya
 Hoda Zeinolabedin as Rabia Balkhi
 Dariush Reshadat as Hares
 Pouria Tehrani as Bektash
 Pejman Bazeghi as Amir Kabir
 Elham Nami as Ezzat ed-Dowleh
 Hassan Shirzad as Haj Ali Khan Farashbashi
 Hamidreza Molana as Adolf Hitler
 Marene Van Holk as Eva Braun
 Manoochehr Azar as Senior Malak al-Maut

References

External links
 

2019 films
Films shot in Iran
2010s Persian-language films
2019 drama films
Iranian drama films